Stenersen may refer to:

Eivind Stenersen Engelstad (1900–1969), Norwegian archaeologist and art historian
Gudmund Stenersen (1863–1934), Norwegian painter and illustrator
Martin Stenersen (1879–1968), Norwegian rifle shooter
Rolf Stenersen (1899–1978), Norwegian athlete, businessman, art collector, writer
Ruth Stenersen (born 1960), Norwegian politician for the Christian Democratic Party
Stener Johannes Stenersen (1835–1904), Norwegian veterinarian
Sverre Stenersen (1926–2005), Norwegian Nordic combined skier

See also
Margaret Stenersen Elementary School in the Fraser Valley of British Columbia
Stenersen Museum (Norwegian: Stenersenmuseet), an art museum in Oslo, Norway
Stensen
Stenson (disambiguation)
Stensån

Norwegian-language surnames